Outlier is a statistical term.

Outlier or Outliers can also refer to: 

  Outlier (album), by Twelve Foot Ninja
 Outlier, an album by Kingdom Come
 Outlier (ballet), by Wayne McGregor
 Outlier (TV series), Norwegian TV crime drama broadcast in 2020
 Outliers (book), by Malcolm Gladwell
 Exclave, a geopolitical term 
 Polynesian outlier, culturally Polynesian islands which lie in Melanesia and Micronesia
 Inliers and outliers (geology), a geological term
 Anomaly detection in data mining

See also Outlier in Wiktionary.